The Misanthrope is a tempera painting on canvas by the Flemish Renaissance artist Pieter Bruegel the Elder, created during 1568. It currently is held and exhibited at the National Museum of Capodimonte in Naples, Italy.

Description

The circular painting is encased in a square frame and depicts a black-robed, white-bearded elderly man clasping his hands before him.  A smaller barefooted man behind him uses a knife to cut the strings to the elderly man's moneypouch.  The elderly man appears so lost in thought that he notices neither the theft nor the caltrops that lie in his path.  A globus cruciger encloses the thief.  A Flemish inscription at the bottom reads:

Om dat de werelt is soe ongetru / Daer om gha ic in den ru("Because the world is perfidious, I am going into mourning").

Interpretation

The hooded misanthrope is being robbed by the small figure in the glass ball who is holding his purse. That figure is a symbol of vanity. The symbolism in the painting portrays how impossible it is for his actions to lead to giving up the world. The misanthrope also is walking unaware toward caltrops set for him by the world (cast in his path). He cannot renounce the world as he would wish and he is contrasted with the shepherd in the background, who guards his sheep and who is more virtuous than the misanthrope because of his simple, honourable performance of his duties and his sense of responsibility toward his charges.

References

Works cited

Further reading
 (see index)

External links

The Misanthrope at the Capodimonte Gallery 
Bosch Bruegel Society
99 works by Pieter Bruegel the Elder
Complete list of paintings which includes inscriptions, with explanation 
 Creativity Brueghel laid the foundation of the Netherlands School

1568 paintings
Paintings by Pieter Bruegel the Elder
Paintings in the collection of the Museo di Capodimonte